Tony Windo (born 30 April 1969 in Gloucester, England) is an English former professional rugby union footballer and current coach. He started his playing career at Gloucester before moving to Worcester Warriors in 1999, staying there until his retirement in 2008. Windo was called up to the 1998 England rugby union tour of Australasia and South Africa which became known later as the 'Tour of Hell', however he was ultimately not capped at that level.

Since retiring from playing, he has held coaching positions at several clubs and schools including Worcester Warriors, Gloucester, Stourbridge and Bromsgrove School.

References

External links
Premiership Rugby Profile
European Professional Club Rugby Profile
Worcester Warriors Profile

1969 births
Living people
English rugby union players
English rugby union coaches
Worcester Warriors players
Gloucester Rugby players
Rugby union players from Gloucester